This is a list of things named after Leonardo da Vinci.

Places
 Leonardo da Vinci–Fiumicino Airport, Rome, Italy
 Museo della Scienza e della Tecnologia "Leonardo da Vinci", Milan, Italy
 Da Vinci, a crater on the Moon
 Da Vinci-Broen (Da Vinci Bridge), a small-scale replica of the bridge Leonardo designed to span the Golden Horn, in Ås, Viken, Norway
 Da Vinci Research Park, a science park located in Brussels, Belgium
 Da Vinci, a Michelin-starred restaurant in Maasbracht, Netherlands
 Da Vinci Tower, a proposed 420-metre (1,378 ft), 80-floor tower in Dubai, United Arab Emirates
 Leonardo Da Vinci Centre, a community centre in Victoria, BC run by the Italian Cultural Society

Streets and squares

 Piazza Leonardo da Vinci, Milan
 Leonardo da Vinci Street, Budapest, Hungary
 Leonardo-da-Vinci-Platz, Bochum, North Rhine-Westphalia, Germany
 Via Leonardo da Vinci, Guidonia Montecelio, Rome, Italy
 Via Leonardo da Vinci, Merano, South Tyrol, Italy
 Rue Léonard de Vinci, Massy, Essonne, France
 Leonardo da Vinci streets in Ashdod and Tel Aviv in Israel

Schools and colleges
 Colégio Anglo Leonardo da Vinci, São Paulo, Brazil
 DaVinci Academy of Science and the Arts, a charter high school in Ogden, Utah
 Leonardo da Vinci Art Institute, Cairo, Egypt
 Leonardo da Vinci Art School, formerly in New York City
 Leonardo da Vinci Gymnasium, Neckargemünd, Germany
 Leonardo da Vinci High School, Davis, California
 Leonardo da Vinci High School, Buffalo, New York
 Da Vinci College, Chaddesden, Derbyshire, England
 Scuola elementare "Leonardo da Vinci", Vergaio, Prato, Tuscany, Italy
 da Vinci Arts Middle School, Portland, Oregon

Ships
 Leonardo da Vinci, a Conte di Cavour class battleship of the Italian navy. (1910–1923)
 Leonardo da Vinci, a Marconi class submarine of the Italian Navy. (1940–1943)
 SS Leonardo da Vinci, an ocean liner in service for Italian Line between 1960 and 1978. (1960–1982)
 GTS Da Vinci, briefly (in 2008) the name of a cruise ship owned by Club Cruise (1977–2008)

Technology
 DAVINCI+, a planned NASA mission to send an atmospheric probe to Venus
 Da Vinci Machine, a Sun Microsystems project aiming to prototype the extension of the Java Virtual Machine to add support for dynamic languages
 da Vinci Project, a former project to launch a suborbital crewed spacecraft
 Da Vinci Surgical System, a robotic surgery system
 da Vinci Systems, Color Correctors
 DaVinci Works, industrial automation software for window and door manufacturers
 Leonardo MPLM, a multi-purpose logistics module used to re-supply the International Space Station
 Texas Instruments DaVinci, a system-on-a-chip for digital video
 DaVinci Resolve, a video editor produced by Blackmagic Design

Music
 Da Vinci, a Portuguese pop rock band
 Da Vinci's Notebook, an American a cappella group.

Fictional characters
 Leonardo, a lead character in Teenage Mutant Ninja Turtles
 Léonard, lead character of the eponymous comic series by Philippe Liégeois and Bob De Groot
 Leonardo Acropolis, a painter in the BBC sitcom Blackadder II
 Giulietta da Vinci, fictional character from the 1999 James Bond film The World Is Not Enough
 Leonard of Quirm, the analogue of Da Vinci in Terry Pratchett's Discworld series of novels.
 Larry Da Vinci, a character in the LittleBigPlanet series of games.
Da Vinci, a character in 101 Dalmatian Street.

Awards
 Leonardo da Vinci International Award, awarded by an international consortium of Rotary Clubs
 ASME Leonardo Da Vinci Award, awarded by the American Society of Mechanical Engineers
 Leonardo da Vinci World Award of Arts, awarded by the World Cultural Council (Mexico)
 Leonardo da Vinci Medal, awarded by the Society for the History of Technology

Business
 Leonardo S.p.A., an Italian multinational aerospace, defence and security company
 da Vinci Designs, a manufacturer of tandem bicycles in Denver, Colorado

Other
Leonardo davincii, a species of moth from Sudan
 Leonardo da Vinci programme (European Commission funding programme)
 Da Vinci's Challenge, a board game
 The House of Da Vinci, a video game

External links

Named Things
Leonardo da Vinci
Leonardo da Vinci,Named Things